Island council elections were held in the Netherlands Antilles on 7 April (Bonaire and Sint Maarten) and 12 May 1995 (Curaçao, Saba and Sint Eustatius) to elect the members of the island councils of its five island territories. The election was won by the Bonaire Democratic Party (5 seats) in Bonaire, the Party for the Restructured Antilles (8 seats) in Curaçao, the Saba Democratic Labour Movement (3 seats) in Saba, the Democratic Party Statia (3 seats) in Sint Eustatius, and the Democratic Party (7 seats) in Sint Maarten.

Results

Bonaire

Curaçao

Saba

Sint Eustatius

Sint Maarten
The Democratic Party and the Sint Maarten Patriotic Alliance both won five seats, with the other seat in the 11-seat island council going to the Serious Alternative People's Party. The DP and SAPP agreed to form a coalition government.

References

Netherlands
1995 in the Netherlands Antilles
1995 in Sint Maarten
April 1995 events in North America
May 1995 events in North America
Elections in the Netherlands Antilles
Elections in Bonaire
Elections in Curaçao
Elections in Saba (island)
Elections in Sint Eustatius
Elections in Sint Maarten
Election and referendum articles with incomplete results